Zeltweg Air Base, now known as Fliegerhorst Hinterstoisser, is a military airfield in Styria, Austria near Zeltweg. It is the main airfield of the Austrian Air Force. It was also used as a motor racing circuit in the 1960s.

History
Since 1997, the AirPower show is held at Zeltweg. The 2003 and 2005 editions featured Red Bull Air Race events. The show was held in 1997, 2000, 2003, 2005, 2009, 2011, 2013, 2016 and 2019. It is scheduled to be held again in 2022.

Motorsports
Built in 1959 in Styria, the idea for the track came from the United Kingdom's success at Silverstone Circuit, also built on the site of an airfield. However, the track engineers at Zeltweg failed to take into account the abrasive nature of the surface. A lone Formula One World Championship Grand Prix was held in 1964. The World Sportscar Championship Zeltweg 500 Kilometres was held later, until the track was abandoned in 1969 following the construction of the purpose-built Österreichring just across the street.

Lap records
The Formula 1 lap record on the Zeltweg Airfield circuit is 1:10.560 by Dan Gurney in a Brabham BT7, while the overall lap record is 1:04.820 and was set by Jo Siffert in a Porsche 908 during the 1968 Zeltweg 500 Kilometres. The official race lap records at the Zeltweg Air Base are listed as:

References

Austrian Grand Prix
Formula One circuits
Motorsport venues in Austria
Austrian Air Force airbases
Sports venues in Styria